An electric vehicle battery (EVB, also known as a traction battery) is a rechargeable battery used to power the electric motors of a battery electric vehicle (BEV) or hybrid electric vehicle (HEV). 

Electric vehicle batteries differ from starting, lighting, and ignition (SLI) batteries, as they are typically lithium-ion batteries that are designed for high power-to-weight ratio, specific energy and energy density; smaller, lighter batteries are desirable because they reduce the weight of the vehicle and therefore improve its performance. Compared to liquid fuels, most current battery technologies have much lower specific energy, and this often impacts the maximum range of all-electric vehicles.

The most common battery type in modern electric vehicles are lithium-ion and lithium polymer.  Other types of rechargeable batteries used in electric vehicles include lead–acid ("flooded", deep-cycle, and valve regulated lead acid), nickel-cadmium, nickel–metal hydride, and, less commonly, zinc–air, and sodium nickel chloride (zebra) batteries. The amount of electricity (i.e. electric charge) stored in batteries is measured in ampere hours or in coulombs, with the total energy often measured in kilowatt-hours (kWh).

Since the late 1990s, advances in lithium-ion battery technology have been driven by demands from portable electronics, laptop computers, mobile phones, and power tools. The BEV and HEV marketplace has reaped the benefits of these advances both in performance and energy density. Unlike earlier battery chemistries, notably nickel-cadmium, lithium-ion batteries can be discharged and recharged daily and at any state of charge.

The battery pack makes up a significant cost of a BEV or a HEV. , the cost of electric vehicle batteries has fallen 87% since 2010 on a per kilowatt-hour basis.

In terms of operating costs, the price of electricity to run a BEV is a small fraction of the cost of fuel for equivalent internal combustion engines, reflecting higher energy efficiency.

Electric vehicle battery types

Lead-acid

Flooded lead-acid batteries are the oldest, cheapest, and, in the past, most common vehicle batteries available. There are two main types of lead-acid batteries: automobile engine starter batteries, and deep cycle batteries. Automobile engine starter batteries are designed to use a small percentage of their capacity to provide high charge rates to start the engine, while deep cycle batteries are used to provide continuous electricity to run electric vehicles like forklifts or golf carts. Deep cycle batteries are also used as the auxiliary batteries in recreational vehicles, but they require different, multi-stage charging. No lead acid battery should be discharged below 50% of its capacity, as it shortens the battery's life. Flooded batteries require inspection of electrolyte levels and occasional replacement of water, which gases away during the normal charging cycle.

Previously, most electric vehicles used lead-acid batteries due to their mature technology, high availability, and low cost, with the notable exception of some early BEVs, such as the Detroit Electric which used a nickel–iron battery. Deep-cycle lead batteries are expensive and have a shorter life than the vehicle itself, typically needing replacement every 3 years.

Lead-acid batteries in EV applications end up being a significant (25–50%) portion of the final vehicle mass. Like all batteries, they have significantly lower specific energy than petroleum fuels—in this case, 30–50 W⋅h/kg. While the difference isn't as extreme as it first appears due to the lighter drive-train in an EV, even the best batteries tend to lead to higher masses when applied to vehicles with a normal range. The efficiency (70–75%) and storage capacity of the current generation of common deep cycle lead acid batteries decreases with lower temperatures, and diverting power to run a heating coil reduces efficiency and range by up to 40%.

Charging and operation of batteries typically results in the emission of hydrogen, oxygen and sulfur, which are naturally occurring and normally harmless if properly vented. Early Citicar owners discovered that, if not vented properly, unpleasant sulfur smells would leak into the cabin immediately after charging.

Lead-acid batteries powered such early modern EVs as the original versions of the EV1.

Nickel-metal hydride

Nickel-metal hydride batteries are now considered a relatively mature technology. While less efficient (60–70%) in charging and discharging than even lead-acid, they have a specific energy of 30–80 W⋅h/kg, far higher than lead-acid. When used properly, nickel-metal hydride batteries can have exceptionally long lives, as has been demonstrated in their use in hybrid cars and in the surviving first-generation NiMH Toyota RAV4 EVs that still operate well after  and over a decade of service. Downsides include the poor efficiency, high self-discharge, very finicky charge cycles, and poor performance in cold weather.

GM Ovonic produced the NiMH battery used in the second generation EV-1, and Cobasys makes a nearly identical battery (ten 1.2 V 85 A⋅h NiMH cells in series in contrast with eleven cells for Ovonic battery). This worked very well in the EV-1. Patent encumbrance has limited the use of these batteries in recent years.

Zebra

The sodium nickel chloride or "Zebra" battery uses a molten sodium chloroaluminate (NaAlCl4) salt as the electrolyte. A relatively mature technology, the Zebra battery has a specific energy of 120 W⋅h/kg. Since the battery must be heated for use, cold weather does not strongly affect its operation except for increasing heating costs. They have been used in several EVs such as the Modec commercial vehicle. Zebra batteries can last for a few thousand charge cycles and are nontoxic.

Lithium-ion

lithium-ion (and the mechanistically similar lithium polymer) batteries, were initially developed and commercialized for use in laptops and consumer electronics. With their high energy density and long cycle life they have become the leading battery type for use in EVs. The first commercialized lithium-ion chemistry was a lithium cobalt oxide cathode and a graphite anode first demonstrated by N. Godshall in 1979, and by John Goodenough, and Akira Yoshino shortly thereafter. The downside of traditional lithium-ion batteries include sensitivity to temperature, low temperature power performance, and performance degradation with age. Due to the volatility of organic electrolytes, the presence of highly oxidized metal oxides, and the thermal instability of the anode SEI layer, traditional lithium-ion batteries pose a fire safety risk if punctured or charged improperly. These early cells did not accept or supply charge when extremely cold, and so heaters can be necessary in some climates to warm them. The maturity of this technology is moderate. The Tesla Roadster (2008) and other cars produced by the company used a modified form of traditional lithium-ion "laptop battery" cells.

Recent EVs are using new variations on lithium-ion chemistry that sacrifice specific energy and specific power to provide fire resistance, environmental friendliness, rapid charging (as quickly as a few minutes), and longer lifespans. These variants (phosphates, titanates, spinels, etc.) have been shown to have a much longer lifetime, with A123 types using lithium iron phosphate lasting at least more than 10 years and more than 7000 charge/discharge cycles, and LG Chem expecting their lithium-manganese spinel batteries to last up to 40 years.

Much work is being done on lithium-ion batteries in the lab. Lithium vanadium oxide has already made its way into the Subaru prototype G4e, doubling energy density. Silicon nanowires, silicon nanoparticles, and tin nanoparticles promise several times the energy density in the anode, while composite and superlattice cathodes also promise significant density improvements.

New data has shown that exposure to heat and the use of fast charging promote the degradation of Li-ion batteries more than age and actual use, and that the average electric vehicle battery will retain 90% of its initial capacity after six years and six months of service. For example, the battery in a Nissan Leaf will degrade twice as fast as the battery in a Tesla, because the Leaf does not have an active cooling system for its battery.

Battery capacity
Non–plug-in hybrid cars have battery capacities between 0.65 kW⋅h (2012 Honda Civic Hybrid) and 1.8 kW⋅h (2001 Toyota Prius).

Plug-in hybrid cars have battery capacities between 4.4 kW⋅h (2012 Toyota Prius Plug-in Hybrid) and 40.6  kW⋅h (Li Auto One).

All-electric cars have battery capacities between 6.0 kW⋅h (2012 Renault Twizy) and 212.7 kW⋅h (2022 GMC Hummer EV).

Battery cost

In 2010, scientists at the Technical University of Denmark paid US$10,000 for a certified EV battery with 25 kWh capacity (i.e. US$400/kWh), with no rebates or surcharges. Two out of 15 battery producers could supply the necessary technical documents about quality and fire safety. In 2010 it was estimated that at most 10 years would pass before the battery price would come down to one-third.

A 2013 study by the American Council for an Energy-Efficient Economy reported that battery costs came down from /kWh in 2007 to /kWh in 2012. The U.S. Department of Energy has set cost targets for its sponsored battery research of /kWh in 2015 and /kWh by 2022. Cost reductions through advances in battery technology and higher production volumes will allow plug-in electric vehicles to be more competitive with conventional internal combustion engine vehicles. In 2016, the world had a Li-ion production capacity of 41.57 GW⋅h.

The actual costs for cells are subject to much debate and speculation as most EV manufacturers refuse to discuss this topic in detail. However, in October 2015, car maker GM revealed at their annual Global Business Conference that they expected a price of /kWh for Li-ion cells entering 2016, substantially lower than other analysts' cost estimates. GM also expects a cost of /kWh by the end of 2021.

According to a study published in February 2016 by Bloomberg New Energy Finance (BNEF), battery prices fell 65% since 2010, and 35% just in 2015, reaching /kWh. The study concludes that battery costs are on a trajectory to make electric vehicles without government subsidies as affordable as internal combustion engine cars in most countries by 2022. BNEF projects that by 2040, long-range electric cars will cost less than  expressed in 2016 dollars. BNEF expects electric car battery costs to be well below /kWh by 2030, and to fall further thereafter as new chemistries become available.

Battery cost estimate comparison

EV parity
In 2010, battery professor Poul Norby stated that he believed that lithium batteries will need to double their specific energy and bring down the price from US$500 (2010) to US$100 per kWh capacity in order to make an impact on petrol cars. Citigroup indicates US$230/kWh.

Toyota Prius 2012 plug-in's official page declare  of range and a battery capacity of 5.2 kWh with a ratio of /kWh, while the Addax (2015 model) utility vehicle already reaches 110 kilometres (68.5 mi) or a ratio of 7.5 kilometers (4.6 mi)/kWh.

Battery electric cars have an energy consumption between /kWh (85 MPGe) and /kWh (135 MPGe).

United States Secretary of Energy Steven Chu predicted costs for a 40-mile range battery will drop from a price in 2008 of US$12,000 to US$3,600 in 2015 and further to US$1,500 by 2020. lithium-ion, Li-poly, Aluminium-air batteries and zinc-air batteries have demonstrated specific energies high enough to deliver range and recharge times comparable to conventional fossil fueled vehicles.

Cost parity

Different costs are important. One issue is purchase price, the other issue is total cost of ownership. As of 2015, electric cars are more expensive to initially purchase, but cheaper to run, and in at least some cases, total cost of ownership may be lower.

According to Kammen et al., 2008, new PEVs would become cost efficient to consumers if battery prices would decrease from US$1300/kWh to about US$500/kWh (so that the battery may pay for itself).

In 2010, the Nissan Leaf battery pack was reportedly produced at a cost of US$18,000. Nissan's initial production costs at the launch of the Leaf were therefore about US$750 per kilowatt hour (for the 24 kWh battery).

In 2012, McKinsey Quarterly linked battery prices to gasoline prices on a basis of 5-year total cost of ownership for a car, estimating that US$3.50/gallon equates to US$250/kWh. In 2017 McKinsey estimated that electric cars will be competitive at a battery pack cost of US$100/kWh (expected around 2030), and expects pack costs to be US$190/kWh by 2020.

In October 2015, car maker GM revealed at their annual Global Business Conference that they expected a price of US$145 per kilowatt hour for Li-ion cells entering 2016.

Range parity
Driving range parity means that the electric vehicle has the same range as an average all-combustion vehicle, with batteries of specific energy greater than 1 kWh/kg. Higher range means that the electric vehicles would run more kilometers without recharge. Currently, electric vehicle sales are lower than expected due range anxiety - even with the same range as an average all-combustion vehicle, buyers must be assured that there are widely available and compatible charging stations for their vehicles, which are currently not as common as gas stations.

Japanese and European Union officials are in talks to jointly develop advanced rechargeable batteries for electric cars to help nations reduce greenhouse-gas emissions. Developing a battery that can power an electric vehicle  on a single charging is feasible, said Japanese battery maker GS Yuasa Corp. Sharp Corp and GS Yuasa are among Japanese solar-power cell and battery makers that may benefit from cooperation.
 The lithium-ion battery in the AC Propulsion tzero provides  of range per charge (single charge range). The list price of this vehicle when it was released in 2003 was US$220,000.
 Driving in a Daihatsu Mira equipped with 74 kWh lithium ion batteries, the Japan EV Club has achieved a world record for an electric car:  without recharging.
 Zonda Bus, in Jiangsu, China offers the Zonda Bus New Energy with a  only-electric range.
 The supercar Rimac Concept One with 82 kWh battery has a range of 500 km. The car has been in production since 2013.
 The pure electric car BYD e6 with 60 kWh battery has a range of 300 km.

Specifics

Internal components

Battery pack designs for electric vehicles (EVs) are complex and vary widely by manufacturer and specific application. However, they all incorporate a combination of several simple mechanical and electrical component systems which perform the basic required functions of the pack.

The actual battery cells can have different chemistry, physical shapes, and sizes as preferred by various pack manufacturers. Battery packs will always incorporate many discrete cells connected in series and parallel to achieve the total voltage and current requirements of the pack. Battery packs for all electric drive EVs can contain several hundred individual cells. Each cell has a nominal voltage of 3-4 volts, depending on its chemical composition.

To assist in manufacturing and assembly, the large stack of cells is typically grouped into smaller stacks called modules. Several of these modules are placed into a single pack. Within each module the cells are welded together to complete the electrical path for current flow. Modules can also incorporate cooling mechanisms, temperature monitors, and other devices. Modules must remain within a specific temperature range for optimal performance. In most cases, modules also allow for monitoring the voltage produced by each battery cell in the stack by using a battery management system (BMS).

The battery cell stack has a main fuse which limits the current of the pack under a short circuit. A "service plug" or "service disconnect" can be removed to split the battery stack into two electrically isolated halves. With the service plug removed, the exposed main terminals of the battery present no high potential electrical danger to service technicians.

The battery pack also contains relays, or contactors, which control the distribution of the battery pack's electrical power to the output terminals. In most cases there will be a minimum of two main relays which connect the battery cell stack to the main positive and negative output terminals of the pack, which then supply high current to the electrical drive motor. Some pack designs include alternate current paths for pre-charging the drive system through a pre-charge resistor or for powering an auxiliary bus which will also have their own associated control relays. For safety reasons these relays are all normally open.

The battery pack also contains a variety of temperature, voltage, and current sensors. Collection of data from the pack sensors and activation of the pack relays are accomplished by the pack's battery monitoring unit (BMU) or BMS. The BMS is also responsible for communications with the vehicle outside the battery pack.

Recharging
Batteries in BEVs must be periodically recharged. BEVs most commonly charge from the power grid (at home or using a street or shop recharging point), which is in turn generated from a variety of domestic resources, such as coal, hydroelectricity, nuclear, natural gas, and others. Home or grid power, such as photovoltaic solar cell panels, wind, or microhydro may also be used and are promoted because of concerns regarding global warming.

With suitable power supplies, good battery lifespan is usually achieved at charging rates not exceeding half of the capacity of the battery per hour ("0.5C"), thereby taking two or more hours for a full charge, but faster charging is available even for large capacity batteries.

Charging time at home is limited by the capacity of the household electrical outlet, unless specialized electrical wiring work is done.  In the US, Canada, Japan, and other countries with 120V electricity, a normal household outlet delivers 1.5 kilowatts. In other countries with 230V electricity between 7 and 14 kilowatts can be delivered (230V single phase and 400V three-phase, respectively). In Europe, a 400V (three-phase 230V) grid connection is increasingly popular since newer houses don't have natural gas connection due to the European Union's safety regulations.

Recharging time

Electric cars like Tesla Model S, Renault Zoe, BMW i3, etc., can recharge their batteries to 80 percent at quick charging stations within 30 minutes.

Connectors
The charging power can be connected to the car in two ways. The first is a direct electrical connection known as conductive coupling. This might be as simple as a mains lead into a weatherproof socket through special high capacity cables with connectors to protect the user from high voltages. The modern standard for plug-in vehicle charging is the SAE1772 conductive connector (IEC62196 Type1) in the US. The ACEA has chosen the VDE-AR-E 2623-2-2 (IEC62196 Type2) for deployment in Europe, which, without a latch, means unnecessary extra power requirements for the locking mechanism.

The second approach is known as inductive charging. A special 'paddle' is inserted into a slot on the car. The paddle is one winding of a transformer, while the other is built into the car. When the paddle is inserted it completes a magnetic circuit which provides power to the battery pack. In one inductive charging system, one winding is attached to the underside of the car, and the other stays on the floor of the garage. The advantage of the inductive approach is that there is no possibility of electrocution as there are no exposed conductors, although interlocks, special connectors and ground fault detectors can make conductive coupling nearly as safe. Inductive charging can also reduce vehicle weight, by moving more charging componentry offboard. An inductive charging advocate from Toyota contended in 1998, that overall cost differences were minimal, while a conductive charging advocate from Ford contended that conductive charging was more cost efficient.

Recharging spots

, there are 93,439 locations and 178,381 EV charging stations worldwide.

Though there are a lot of charging stations worldwide, and the number is only growing, an issue with this is that an EV driver may find themselves at a remote charging station with another vehicle plugged in to the only charger or they may find another vehicle parked in the only EV spot. Currently, no laws prohibit unplugging another person's vehicle, it is simply ruled by etiquette.

Travel range before recharging

The range of a BEV depends on the number and type of batteries used. The weight and type of vehicle as well as terrain, weather, and the performance of the driver also have an impact, just as they do on the mileage of traditional vehicles. Electric vehicle conversion performance depends on a number of factors including the battery chemistry:
 Lead-acid batteries are the most available and inexpensive.
 New lithium-ion battery-equipped EVs provide  of range per charge. Lithium is also less expensive than nickel.
 Nickel-zinc battery are cheaper and lighter than Nickel-cadmium batteries. They are also cheaper than (but not as light as) lithium-ion batteries.

The internal resistance of some batteries may be significantly increased at low temperature which can cause noticeable reduction in the range of the vehicle and on the lifetime of the battery.

Finding the economic balance of range versus performance, battery capacity versus weight, and battery type versus cost challenges every EV manufacturer.

With an AC system or advanced DC system, regenerative braking can extend range by up to 50% under extreme traffic conditions without complete stopping. Otherwise, the range is extended by about 10 to 15% in city driving, and only negligibly in highway driving, depending upon terrain.

BEVs (including buses and trucks) can also use genset trailers and pusher trailers in order to extend their range when desired without the additional weight during normal short range use. Discharged basket trailers can be replaced by recharged ones en route. If rented then maintenance costs can be deferred to the agency.

Some  BEVs can become Hybrid vehicles depending on the trailer and car types of energy and powertrain.

Trailers
Auxiliary battery capacity carried in trailers can increase the overall vehicle range, but also increases the loss of power arising from aerodynamic drag, increases weight transfer effects and reduces traction capacity.

Swapping and removing

An alternative to recharging is to exchange drained or nearly drained batteries (or battery range extender modules) with fully charged batteries. This is called battery swapping and is done in exchange stations.

Features of swap stations include:

 The consumer is no longer concerned with battery capital cost, life cycle, technology, maintenance, or warranty issues;
 Swapping is far faster than charging: battery swap equipment built by the firm Better Place has demonstrated automated swaps in less than 60 seconds;
 Swap stations increase the feasibility of distributed energy storage via the electric grid;

Concerns about swap stations include:

 Potential for fraud (battery quality can only be measured over a full discharge cycle; battery lifetime can only be measured over repeated discharge cycles; those in the swap transaction cannot know if they are getting a worn or reduced effectiveness battery; battery quality degrades slowly over time, so worn batteries will be gradually forced into the system)
 Manufacturers' unwillingness to standardize battery access / implementation details
 Safety concerns

Re-filling
Zinc-bromine flow batteries can be re-filled using a liquid, instead of recharged by connectors, saving time.

Lifecycle of lithium-based EV batteries 

There are mainly four stages during the lifecycle  of  lithium-based  EV  batteries:  the raw materials phase, the battery manufacturing, operation phase and the end-of-life management phase. As shown in the schematic of life cycle of EV batteries, during the first stage, the rare earth materials are extracted in different parts of the world. After they are refined by pre-processing factories, the battery manufacturing companies take over these materials and start to produce batteries and assemble them into packs. These battery packs are then sent to car manufacturing companies for EV integration. A good end-of-life management phase will try to close the loop. The used battery packs will either be reused as stationary storage or recycled depending on the battery state of health (SOH).

The battery lifecycle is rather long and requires close cooperation between companies and countries.  Currently, the raw materials phase and the battery manufacturing and operation phase are well established.  The end-of-life management phase is struggled to grow, especially the recycling  process mainly because of economics.  For example, only 6% of lithium-ion batteries were collected for recycling in 2017–2018 in Australia. However, closing the loop is extremely important. Not only because of a predicted tightened supply of nickel, cobalt and lithium in the future, also recycling EV batteries has the potential to maximize the environmental benefit. Xu et al. predicted that in the sustainable development scenario, lithium, cobalt and nickel will reach or surpass the amount of known reserves in the future if no recycling is in place. Ciez and Whitacre found that by deploying battery recycling some green house gas (GHG) emission from mining could be avoided.

To develop a deeper understanding of the lifecycle of EV batteries, it is important to analyze the emission associated with different phases. Using NMC cylindrical cells as an example, Ciez and Whitacre found that around 9 kg CO2e kg battery−1 is emitted during raw materials pre-processing and battery manufacturing under the US average electricity grid. The biggest part of the emission came from materials preparation accounting for more than 50% of the emissions. If NMC pouch cell is used, the total emission increases to almost 10 kg CO2e kg battery−1 while materials manufacturing still contributes to more than 50% of the emission. During the end-of-life management phase, the refurbishing process adds little emission to the lifecycle emission. The recycling process, on the other hand, as suggested by Ciez and Whitacre emits a significant amount of GHG. As shown in the battery recycling emission plot a and c, the emission of the recycling process varies with the different recycling processes, different chemistry and different form factor. Thus, the net emission avoided compared to not recycling also varies with these factors. At a glance, as shown in the plot b and d, the direct recycling process is the most ideal process for recycling pouch cell batteries, while the hydrometallurgical process is most suitable for cylindrical type battery. However, with the error bars shown, the best approach cannot be picked with confidence. It is worth noting that for the lithium iron phosphates (LFP) chemistry, the net benefit is negative. Because LFP cells lacks cobalt and nickel which are expensive and energy intensive to produce, it is more energetically efficient to mine. In general, in addition to promoting the growth of a single sector, a more integrated effort should be in place to reduce the lifecycle emission of EV batteries. A finite total supply of rare earth material can apparently justify the need for recycling. But the environmental benefit of recycling needs closer scrutiny. Based on current recycling technology, the net benefit of recycling depends on the form factors, the chemistry and the recycling process chosen.

Manufacturing 
There are mainly three stages during the manufacturing process of EV batteries: materials manufacturing, cell manufacturing and integration, as shown in Manufacturing process of EV batteries graph in grey, green and orange color respectively. This shown process does not include manufacturing of cell hardware, i.e. casings and current collectors. During the materials manufacturing process, the active material, conductivity additives, polymer binder and solvent are mixed first. After this, they are coated on the current collectors ready for the drying process. During this stage, the methods of making active materials depend on the electrode and the chemistry. For the cathode, two of the most popular chemistry are transition metal oxides, i.e. Lithium nickel manganese cobalt oxides (Li-NMC) and Lithium metal phosphates, i.e. Lithium iron phosphates (LFP). For the anode, the most popular chemistry now is graphite. However, recently there have been a lot of companies started to make Si mixed anode (Sila Nanotech, Prologium) and Li metal anode(Cuberg, Solid Power). In general, for active materials production, there are three steps: materials preparation, materials processing and refinement. Schmuch et al. discussed materials manufacturing in greater details.

In the cell manufacturing stage, the prepared electrode will be processed to the desired shape for packaging in a cylindrical, rectangular or pouch format. Then after filling the electrolytes and sealing the cells, the battery cells are cycled carefully to form SEI protecting the anode. Then, these batteries are assembled into packs ready for vehicle integration. Kwade et al. discuss the overall battery manufacturing process in greater detail.

Reusing and repurposing 
When an EV battery pack degrades to 70% to 80% of its original capacity, it is defined to reach the end-of-life. One of the waste management methods is to reuse the pack. By repurposing the pack for stationary storage, more value can be extracted from the battery pack while reducing the per kWh lifecycle impact. However, enabling battery second-life is not easy. Several challenges are hindering the development of the battery refurbishing industry.

First, uneven and undesired battery degradation happens during EV operation. Each battery cell could degrade differently during operation. Currently, the state of health (SOH) information from a battery management system (BMS) can be extracted on a pack level. Getting the cell state of health information requires next-generation BMS. In addition, because a lot of factors could contribute to the low SOH at the end of life, such as temperature during operation, charging/discharging pattern and calendar degradation, the degradation mechanism could be different. Thus, just knowing the SOH is not enough to ensure the quality of the refurbished pack. To solve this challenge, engineers can mitigate the degradation by engineering the next-generation thermal management system. To fully understand the degradation inside the battery, computational methods including the first-principle method, physics-based model and machine learning based method should work together to identify the different degradation modes and quantify the level of degradation after severe operations. Lastly, more efficient battery characteristics tools, for instance, electrochemical impedance spectroscopy (EIS) should be used to ensure the quality of the battery pack.

Second, it is costly and time-intensive to disassemble modules and cells. Following the last point, the first step is testing to determine the remaining SOH of the battery modules. This operation could vary for each retired system. Next, the module must be fully discharged. Then, the pack must be disassembled and reconfigured to meet the power and energy requirement of the second life application. It is important to note that qualified workers and specialized tools are required to dismantle the high weight and high voltage EV batteries. Besides the solutions discussed in the previous section, a refurbishing company can sell or reuse the discharged energy from the module to reduce the cost of this process. To accelerate the disassembly process, there have been several attempts to incorporate robots in this process. In this case, robots can handle more dangerous task increasing the safety of the dismantling process.

Third, battery technology is non-transparent and lacks standards. Because battery development is the core part of EV, it is difficult for the manufacturer to label the exact chemistry of cathode, anode and electrolytes on the pack. In addition, the capacity and the design of the cells and packs changes on a yearly basis. The refurbishing company needs to closely work with the manufacture to have a timely update on this information. On the other hand, government can set up labeling standard.

Lastly, the refurbishing process adds cost to the used batteries. Since 2010, the battery costs have decreased by over 85% which is significantly faster than the prediction. Because of the added cost of refurbishing, the refurbished unit may be less attractive than the new batteries to the market.

Nonetheless, there have been several successes on the second-life application as shown in the examples of storage projects using second-life EV batteries. They are used in less demanding stationary storage application as peak shaving or additional storage for renewable-based generating sources.

Recycling 

Although battery life span can be extended by enabling a second-life application, ultimately EV batteries need to be recycled. Recyclability is not currently an important design consideration for battery manufacturers, and in 2019 only 5% of electric vehicle batteries were recycled. BEV technologies lack an established recycling framework in many countries, making the usage of BEV and other battery-operated electrical equipment a large energy expenditure, ultimately increasing  emissions - especially in countries lacking renewable energy resources. Currently, there are five types of recycling processes: Pyrometallurgical recovery, Physical materials separation, Hydrometallurgical metal reclamation, Direct recycling method and Biological metals reclamation. The most widely used processes are the first three processes listed, as shown in the examples of current lithium-ion battery recycling facilities. The last two methods are still on lab or pilot scale, however, they can potentially avoid the largest amount of emission from mining.

The pyrometallurgical process involves burning the battery materials with slag, limestone, sand and coke to produce a metal alloy using a high-temperature furnace. The resulted materials are a metallic alloy, slag and gases. The gases comprise molecules that are evaporated from the electrolyte and binder components. The metal alloy can be separated through hydrometallurgical processes into constituent materials. The slag which is a mixture of metals aluminum, manganese and lithium can either be reclaimed by hydrometallurgical processes or used in the cement industry. This process is very versatile and relatively safe. Because there is no pre-sorting needed, it can work with a wide variety of batteries. In addition, because the whole cell is burnt, the metal from the current collectors could help the smelting process and because of the exothermic reaction of burning electrolyte sand plastics the energy consumption can also be reduced. However, this process still requires relatively higher energy consumption and only a limited number of materials can be reclaimed. Physical materials separation recovered materials by mechanical crushing and exploiting physical properties of different components such as particle size, density, ferromagnetism and hydrophobicity. Copper, aluminum and steel casing can be recovered by sorting. The remaining materials, called "black mass", which is composed of nickel, cobalt, lithium and manganese, need a secondary treatment to recover. For the hydrometallurgical process, the cathode materials need to be crushed to remove the current collector. Then, the cathode materials are leached by aqueous solutions to extract the desired metals from cathode materials. Direct cathode recycling as the name suggested extracts the materials directly, yielding a cathode power that is ready to be used as new cathode pristine material. This process involves extracting the electrolyte using liquid or supercritical CO2.  After the size of the recovered components is reduced, the cathode materials can be separated out. For the biological metals reclamation or bio-leaching, the process uses microorganisms to digest metal oxides selectively. Then, recyclers can reduce these oxides to produce metal nanoparticles. Although bio-leaching has been used successfully in the mining industry, this process is still nascent to the recycling industry and plenty of opportunities exists for further investigation.

There have been many efforts around the world to promote recycling technologies development and deployment. In the US, the Department of Energy Vehicle Technologies Offices (VTO) set up two efforts targeting at innovation and practicability of recycling processes. ReCell Lithium Recycling RD center brings in three universities and three national labs together to develop innovative, efficient recycling technologies. Most notably, the direct cathode recycling method was developed by the ReCell center. On the other hand, VTO also set up the battery recycling prize to incentivize American entrepreneurs to find innovative solutions to solve current challenges.

Environmental impact 
Transition to electric vehicles is estimated to require an 87,000% increase in supply of specific metals by 2060 that need to be mined initially, with recycling (see above) covering part of the demand in future. In the UK alone, it is estimated that switching 31.5 million petrol vehicles to electric would require "207,900 tonnes of cobalt, 264,600 tonnes of lithium carbonate, 7,200 tonnes of neodymium and dysprosium, and 2,362,500 tonnes of copper", and a worldwide switch would require 40 times these amounts. In 2022 the US government planned to give US states $5 billion over five years for electric vehicle chargers. According to IEA 2021 study, mineral supplies need to increase from 400 kilotonnes in 2020 to 11,800 kilotonnes in 2040 in order to cover the demand by EV. This increase creates a number of key challenges, from supply chain (as 60% of production is concentrated in China) to significant impact on climate and environment as result of such a large increase in mining operations.

Vehicle-to-grid 

Smart grid allows BEVs to provide power to the grid at any time, especially:
 During peak load periods (When the selling price of electricity can be very high. Vehicles can then be recharged during off-peak hours at cheaper rates which helps absorb excess night time generation. The vehicles serve as a distributed battery storage system to buffer power.)
 During blackouts, as backup power sources.

Safety 
The safety issues of battery electric vehicles are largely dealt with by the international standard ISO 6469. This standard is divided into three parts:
 On-board electrical energy storage, i.e. the battery
 Functional safety means and protection against failures
 Protection of persons against electrical hazards.
Firefighters and rescue personnel receive special training to deal with the higher voltages and chemicals encountered in electric and hybrid electric vehicle accidents. While BEV accidents may present unusual problems, such as fires and fumes resulting from rapid battery discharge, many experts agree that BEV batteries are safe in commercially available vehicles and in rear-end collisions, and are safer than gasoline-propelled cars with rear gasoline tanks.

Usually, battery performance testing includes the determination of:
 State Of Charge (SOC)
 State of Health (SOH)
 Energy Efficiency

Performance testing simulates the drive cycles for the drive trains of Battery Electric Vehicles (BEV), Hybrid Electric Vehicles (HEV) and Plug in Hybrid Electric Vehicles (PHEV) as per the required specifications of car manufacturers (OEMs). During these drive cycles, controlled cooling of the battery can be performed, simulating the thermal conditions in the car.

In addition, climatic chambers control environmental conditions during testing and allow simulation of the full automotive temperature range and climatic conditions.

Patents

Patents may be used to suppress development or deployment of battery technology. For example, patents relevant to the use of Nickel metal hydride cells in cars were held by an offshoot of Chevron Corporation, a petroleum company, who maintained veto power over any sale or licensing of NiMH technology.

Research, development and innovation
As of December 2019, billions of euro in research are planned to be invested around the world for improving batteries.

Researchers have come up with some design considerations for contactless BEV chargers. Inductively coupled power transfer (ICPT) systems are made to transfer power efficiently from a primary source (charging station) to one or more secondary sources (BEVs) in a contactless way via magnetic coupling.

Europe has plans for heavy investment in electric vehicle battery development and production, and Indonesia also aims to produce electric vehicle batteries in 2023, inviting Chinese battery firm GEM and Contemporary Amperex Technology Ltd to invest in Indonesia.

Ultracapacitors
Electric double-layer capacitors (or "ultracapacitors") are used in some electric vehicles, such as AFS Trinity's concept prototype, to store rapidly available energy with their high specific power, in order to keep batteries within safe resistive heating limits and extend battery life.

Since commercially available ultracapacitors have a low specific energy, no production electric cars use ultracapacitors exclusively.

In January 2020, Elon Musk, CEO of Tesla, stated that the advancements in Li-ion battery technology have made ultra-capacitors unnecessary for electric vehicles.

Promotion in the United States

There are several kinds of policy measures to make BEVs more desirable. Purchase-based incentives include a tax rebate or a subsidy when buying or registering a modern BEV. Use based policy measures include providing an exemption for congestion charging for BEV users, allowing BEV users to use bus lanes, or giving free parking to BEVs. These can be classified into local and global policy incentives. Local incentives including congestion charge exemptions or free BEV parking in a city only influence those located in this specific area. Global policy incentives including subsidies or national tax rebates apply to anyone in a country.

In 2009, President Barack Obama announced 48 new advanced battery and electric drive projects that would receive US$2.4 billion in funding under the American Recovery and Reinvestment Act. The government claimed that these projects would accelerate the development of U.S. manufacturing capacity for batteries and electric drive components as well as the deployment of electric drive vehicles, helping to establish American leadership in creating the next generation of advanced vehicles. The announcement marked the single largest investment in advanced battery technology for hybrid and electric-drive vehicles ever made. Industry officials expected that this US$2.4 billion investment, coupled with another US$2.4 billion in cost share from the award winners, would result directly in the creation tens of thousands of manufacturing jobs in the U.S. battery and auto industries. The awards cover US$1.5 billion in grants to United States-based manufacturers to produce batteries and their components and to expand battery recycling capacity.
 U.S. Vice President Joe Biden announced in Detroit over US$1 billion in grants to companies and universities based in Michigan. Reflecting the state's leadership in clean energy manufacturing, Michigan companies and institutions received the largest share of grant funding of any state. Two companies, A123 Systems and Johnson Controls, would receive a total of approximately US$550 million to establish a manufacturing base in the state for advanced batteries, and two others, Compact Power and Dow Kokam, would receive a total of over US$300 million for manufacturing battery cells and materials. Large automakers based in Michigan, including GM, Chrysler, and Ford, would receive a total of more than US$400 million to manufacture batteries and electric drive components. Three educational institutions in Michigan — the University of Michigan, Wayne State University in Detroit, and Michigan Technological University in Houghton, in the Upper Peninsula — would receive a total of more than US$10 million for education and workforce training programs to train researchers, technicians, and service providers, and to conduct consumer research to accelerate the transition towards advanced vehicles and batteries.
 U.S. Energy Secretary Steven Chu visited Celgard, in Charlotte, North Carolina, to announce a US$49 million grant for the company to expand its separator production capacity to serve the expected increased demand for lithium-ion batteries from manufacturing facilities in the United States. Celgard was planning to expand its manufacturing capacity in Charlotte, North Carolina, and nearby Concord, North Carolina, and the company expected the new separator production to come online in 2010. Celgard expected that approximately hundreds of jobs could be created, with the first of those jobs beginning as early as fall 2009.
 EPA Administrator Lisa Jackson was in St. Petersburg, Florida, to announce a US$95.5 million grant for Saft America, Inc. to construct a new plant in Jacksonville on the site of the former Cecil Field military base, to manufacture lithium-ion cells, modules and battery packs for military, industrial, and agricultural vehicles.
 Deputy Secretary of the Department of Transportation John Porcari visited East Penn Manufacturing Co, in Lyon Station, Pennsylvania, to award the company a US$32.5 million grant to increase production capacity for their valve regulated lead-acid batteries and the UltraBattery, a lead-acid battery combined with a carbon supercapacitor, for micro and mild hybrid applications.

On 2 May 2022, President Biden announced the administration will begin a $3.16 billion plan to boost domestic manufacturing and recycling of batteries, in a larger effort to shift the country away from gas-powered cars to electric vehicles. The goal of the Biden administration is to have half of U.S. automobile production electric by 2030.

The Inflation Reduction Act, passed on 16 August 2022, aimed to incentivize clean energy manufacturing with a $7,500 consumer tax credit for EVs with US-built batteries, and subsidies for EV plants. By October 2022, billions of dollars of investment had been announced for over two dozen US battery plants, leading some commentators to nickname the Midwest as the "Battery Belt."

Promotion in Norway
Norway has become a leading example of BEV promotion. The BEV market share is highest in the world in Norway, the main reason being the strong incentives for promoting purchase and ownership of BEVs. Norway has an incentive package for BEVs that often equate or even make a BEV cheaper to purchase than an Internal Combustion Engine Vehicle (ICEV). In addition to the purchase price incentives, there are also incentives that make BEVs more cost-efficient and convenient in daily use. Incentive policies have a clear success for increasing BEV sales in Norway, making it a great case to learn from for other countries wanting to head in the same direction.

See also

Examples 
 List of hybrid vehicles
 List of production battery electric vehicles
 List of electric vehicle battery manufacturers

Related 

 Battery charging
 Battery electric multiple unit
 Battery locomotive
 Charging station
 Dual-mode vehicle
 Electric car energy efficiency
 Flywheel energy storage
 List of battery types
 Rechargeable battery
 Salt water battery
 Traction motor
 Vehicle-to-grid (V2G)

References

External links

Electric vehicle technologies
Rechargeable batteries
Battery applications